William J. Bain (27 March 1896 – 22 January 1985) was a Canadian architect and a founder of the architecture firm, Naramore, Bain, Brady and Johanson, the predecessor to today's NBBJ.

Bain was born in New Westminster, British Columbia.  His family moved to Seattle while he was still young.  Bain expressed an interest in architecture, and his father, a contractor, helped him get a job with Seattle architect Walter R. B. Willcox, from whom he learned the rudiments of drafting and developed beginning skills in architecture.  Bain served in France during World War I, and after the war enrolled in the architecture program at the University of Pennsylvania, from which he graduated in 1921.

After several years in various apprentice positions, Bain opened his own architecture firm in 1924.  He quickly developed a reputation for high-quality residential design.  In 1928, he took Penn classmate Lionel Pries into partnership forming Bain & Pries.  The firm prospered until 1931, then dissolved under the impact of the Depression.  Bain's independent practice gradually recovered and by the late 1930s his firm was receiving a variety of commissions and the designs gradually became more modern.  In 1940, Bain joined a joint-venture with J. Lister Holmes, William Aitken, George W. Stoddard, and John T. Jacobson to design Yesler Terrace, Seattle's first public housing project.  Each of the joint-venture partners continued to maintain their own independent practices as well.  In 1941, Bain and Pries re-established their partnership for a period of about nine months.

During World War II Bain served as camouflage director for the state of Washington. He also joined other architects in joint-venture firms to design housing for war workers as well as other war-related projects.  The joint venture formed in 1943, with Floyd Naramore, Clifton Brady, and Perry Johanson was particularly successful, and became the basis for the post-war firm Naramore, Bain, Brady and Johanson (occasionally called "the combine"), predecessor to today's NBBJ.

Bain remained interested in residential architecture and from 1947 to 1970 he was also a partner in Bain, Overturf and Turner (later Bain and Overturf), a firm that specialized in residential design.

Bain served as president of the Washington State Chapter American Institute of Architects (predecessor to today's AIA Seattle) from 1941 to 1943. Bain was elected a Fellow of the AIA in 1947.

His son, William J. Bain, Jr., is also a successful architect, NBBJ partner and Fellow in the AIA.

References

 Bain, William J., and Bain, Mildred C., Building Together: A Memoir of Our Lives In Seattle, Beckett Publishing Company, Seattle 1991.
 Dietz, Duane, "William J. Bain, Sr.," Shaping Seattle Architecture: A Historical Guide to the Architects Second Edition (Jeffrey Karl Ochsner, editor), University of Washington Press, Seattle and London 2014, pages 260-265, 363, 390-391;  
 Ochsner, Jeffrey Karl, and Rash, David A., "The Emergence of Naramore, Bain, Brady & Johanson and the Search for Modern Architecture in Seattle, 1945-50," Pacific Northwest Quarterly 103/3 (Summer 2012): 123-141. 
 Ochsner, Jeffrey Karl, Lionel H. Pries, Architect, Artist, Educator: From Arts and Crafts to Modern Architecture University of Washington Press, Seattle and London, 2007, pages 70–93, 129-133.

External links
HistoryLink essay on William J. Bain, Sr.

1896 births
1985 deaths
Canadian emigrants to the United States
Fellows of the American Institute of Architects
Architects from Seattle
University of Pennsylvania School of Design alumni
People from New Westminster
Canadian architects